Rosie the Riveter is a 1944 American musical film directed by Joseph Santley and starring Jane Frazee, Frank Albertson and Barbara Jo Allen. It is inspired by the iconic character of the same name.

Plot

Cast
 Jane Frazee as Rosalind "Rosie" Warren
 Frank Albertson as Charlie Doran
 Barbara Jo Allen as Vera Watson
 Frank Jenks as Kelly Kennedy
 Lloyd Corrigan as Clem Prouty
 Frank Fenton as Wayne Calhoun
 Maude Eburne as Granma Quill
 Carl Switzer as Buzz Prouty
 Louise Erickson as Mabel Prouty
 Ellen Lowe as Stella Prouty
 Arthur Loft as Sergeant Montgomery

References

Bibliography
 Hurst, Richard M. Republic Studios: Beyond Poverty Row and the Majors. Scarecrow Press, 2007.

External links 
 
 The Life and Times of Rosie the Riveter videotape collection 1977–1979: A Finding Aid Schlesinger Library, Radcliffe Institute, Harvard University
 Records of The Life and Times of Rosie the Riveter Project, 1974–1980: A Finding Aid Schlesinger Library, Radcliffe Institute, Harvard University

1944 films
1940s English-language films
American black-and-white films
1944 musical films
Republic Pictures films
Films set in California
Films directed by Joseph Santley
American musical films
1940s American films